The eighth season of the American superhero television series The Flash, which is based on the DC Comics character Barry Allen / Flash, premiered on The CW on November 16, 2021. The season follows Barry facing against his nemesis the Reverse-Flash, the fire Meta Deathstorm and the Negative Speed Force. The season starts out with the Arrowverse crossover, “Armageddon”. It is set in the Arrowverse, sharing continuity with the other television series of the universe, and is a spin-off of Arrow. The season is produced by Berlanti Productions, Warner Bros. Television, and DC Entertainment, with Eric Wallace serving as showrunner.

The season was ordered on February 3, 2021. Filming began that August and concluded the following April. Grant Gustin stars as Barry, with principal cast members Candice Patton, Danielle Panabaker, Danielle Nicolet, Kayla Compton, Brandon McKnight, and Jesse L. Martin also returning from previous seasons. This is the last season to feature Martin as a series regular. The series was renewed for a ninth and final season,  which premiered on February 8, 2023.

Episodes 

Season eight is broken into three "Graphic Novel" storyline arcs, known as the fifth, sixth and seventh graphic novels respectively; this numbering continues from the first four "Graphic Novels" established in season six and season seven.

Cast and characters

Main 
 Grant Gustin as Barry Allen / The Flash / Reverse-Flash
 Candice Patton as Iris West-Allen
 Danielle Panabaker as Caitlin Snow and Frost / Hellfrost
 Danielle Nicolet as Cecile Horton
 Kayla Compton as Allegra Garcia
 Brandon McKnight as Chester P. Runk
 Jesse L. Martin as Joe West

Recurring 
 Carmen Moore as Kristen Kramer
 Rachel Drance as Taylor Downs
 Tony Curran as Despero
 Stephanie Izsak as Daisy Korber
 Agam Darshi as Mona Taylor / Queen
 Christian Magby as Deon Owens and Negative Deon Owens
 Tom Cavanagh as Eobard Thawne / Reverse-Flash / The Flash / Negative Reverse-Flash
 Jon Cor as Mark Blaine / Chillblaine
 Jessica Parker Kennedy as Nora West-Allen / XS
 Natalie Dreyfuss as Sue Dearbon
 Mika Abdalla as Tinya Wazzo / Phantom Girl
 Kausar Mohammed as Meena Dhawan / Fast Track

Guest

Production

Development 
The season was announced on February 3, 2021, along with 11 other CW series, including Batwoman and Legends of Tomorrow.

Writing 
Speaking to the events of the season, showrunner Eric Wallace said that Barry Allen / The Flash would become "the most confident, incredibly powerful, secure team leader". Wallace then commented that the series would return to Barry and Iris West-Allen's relationship. Wallace went on to hint that multiple relationships, including Joe West and Cecile Horton's, would be further explored and deepened in the season, as well as that Kristen Kramer and August Heart may return in this season. The graphic novel format for the series will continue in the eighth season. Wallace noted that one of the graphic novels would feature a new villain who is "a very scary fellow, and when he shows up, we might dip our toes into the world of horror and the supernatural." In September 2021, Wallace revealed that Joe West is "going to get an incredibly different perspective on life, and it will lead him to a very big choice."

Wallace also revealed that Iris' time sickness will be dealt with after "Armageddon", and that solving it is "a huge, huge part of the entire season, and it will take all season to solve that. And that will have big ramifications for Barry and Iris' relationship and marriage." In March 2022, Wallace confirmed that in writing the season finale, "it all gets resolved by the end of season 8, so we can start fresh and clean, should we, knock on wood, be able to have the privilege to do a season 9", while also writing two endings. Wallace also revealed that Nora West-Allen's sexuality will be acknowledged this season.

Casting 
Series star Grant Gustin returns in the title role of Barry Allen / The Flash. By May 2021, it was unclear if Candice Patton and Danielle Panabaker would return since they were still "negotiating new deals to return". A month later, both actresses, along with Jesse L. Martin, closed their deals. Danielle Nicolet returns as Cecile Horton. In August 2021, it was announced that the guest appearances for the "Armageddon" event would include Tom Cavanagh as Eobard Thawne / Reverse-Flash, Javicia Leslie as Batwoman, Brandon Routh as  The Atom, Cress Williams as Jefferson Pierce / Black Lightning, Chyler Leigh as Sentinel, Katherine McNamara as Mia Queen, Osric Chau as Ryan Choi, and Neal McDonough as Damien Darhk, with Tony Curran joining the cast as Despero shortly after in an undisclosed capacity. Courtney Ford cameos as Nora Darhk in the fifth episode while Katie Cassidy, Juliana Harkavy, and Ben Lewis appear through archive footage as Laurel Lance, Dinah Drake, and William Clayton.

In October 2021, it was announced that Rick Cosnett would reprise his role as Eddie Thawne in a singular flashback episode after the "Armageddon" event, however in February 2022, it was announced that Cosnett would recur in a "multi-episode arc." In November 2021, it was announced that Max Adler would be guest-starring as Jaco Birch / Hotness from season four for one episode. Later that month, it was announced that Robbie Amell would be returning as Ronnie Raymond / Firestorm for two episodes.  In December 2021, newcomer Mika Abdalla was announced as Tinya Wazzo / Phantom Girl. On April 13, 2022, it was announced that this season would be Martin's last as a series regular, though he would still appear in the ninth season.

Filming 
Filming began on August 16, 2021, and concluded on April 27, 2022.

Arrowverse tie-ins 
The first five episodes of the season were crossover event episodes, featuring other actors and heroes from the Arrowverse. The CW President Mark Pedowitz said the episodes would "not quite be a crossover, but it will have a crossover-type feel". One of these potential appearances was Cress Williams, reprising his role from the Arrowverse series Black Lightning as Jefferson Pierce / Black Lightning, who indicated in May 2021 that he had been approached to make a guest appearance in the season and was in talks to appear. Williams said he was "down" to appear since he enjoyed being a part of the "Crisis on Infinite Earths" crossover and felt he and Gustin got along well during their scenes together. Pedowitz also indicated at that time that other actors had also been approached. Re-elaborating in July 2021, Wallace said that the five-episode event would not be like a typical Arrowverse crossover, noting that "I think it’ll give people that sense of scope that you sometimes feel—both emotionally and in the action sequences—with a crossover, without actually having 20 characters in one scene." However, because of the COVID-19 pandemic, restrictions were put in place that limited some of the crew's options. In August 2021, it was announced that the crossover event would be known as "Armageddon" with multiple Arrowverse heroes and villains returning. Wallace described the event as "the most emotional Flash episodes ever" with "some truly epic moments and huge surprises". In November 2021, The Flash showrunner Eric Wallace urged viewers to rewatch the Arrow episode "Green Arrow & The Canaries", as the "Armageddon" event would provide several answers to the loose ends left behind by the episode.

Marketing 
At the virtual 2021 DC FanDome event on October 16, 2021, stars Grant Gustin and Candice Patton revealed the new golden boots as part of the costume in the new season. The first trailer for the “Armageddon” event was released on October 19, 2021, three days after DC FanDome. The official poster for "Armageddon" was released on November 3, 2021. On February 25, 2022, The CW released a new official poster ahead of the mid-season premiere.

Release 
The season premiered on The CW on November 16, 2021.

Two weeks before the premiere, on November 5, 2021, the CW announced their mid-season schedule for their shows, announcing that after "Armageddon", the season would begin airing on Wednesdays starting March 9, 2022. Prior to the season premiere, Wallace stated that the season would have 18 episodes, but it was later confirmed to have 20 episodes.

Ratings

Notes

References

External links 
 

2021 American television seasons
2022 American television seasons
The Flash (2014 TV series) seasons